Wagoner Christian School (WCS) is a private Christian school located in Wagoner, Oklahoma, United States. The school educates in grades K-12. The principal is Debbie Mohabir.

Christian schools in Oklahoma
Educational institutions in the United States with year of establishment missing
Private elementary schools in Oklahoma
Private high schools in Oklahoma
Private middle schools in Oklahoma
Schools in Wagoner County, Oklahoma